Silvio Narizzano (8 February 192726 July 2011) was a Canadian film and television director who worked primarily in the United Kingdom. His directorial credits included the critically acclaimed films Georgy Girl (1966) and Loot (1970), which brought Narizzano several accolades, and television dramas like ITV Play of the Week, Zero One, Court Martial, Come Back, Little Sheba, Staying On, and The Body in the Library. He was nominated for four BAFTA Awards (including once for Best British Film), winning once for Best Drama Series.

Life and career
Born in Montreal to a family of Italian background, Narizzano was educated at Bishop's University, Quebec. His cinematic influences included Richard Lester, Tony Richardson, John Schlesinger, and the French New Wave. He initially worked for the Mountain Playhouse in Montreal and the Canadian Broadcasting Corporation (CBC). He then emigrated to the United Kingdom, where he directed various TV series and his first film, Hammer Horror's Fanatic (1965). Narizzano's most successful film was Georgy Girl (1966), which received four Academy Award nominations as well as a BAFTA nomination for Best British Film, and was entered into the 16th Berlin International Film Festival.

His other work included The Glass Menagerie for Granada TV (1963), Loot, the 1970 film of Joe Orton's play of the same name, the comedy-drama Why Shoot the Teacher? (1977), Demi Moore's debut film Choices, and the made-for-television films Staying On (1980, adapted from Paul Scott's novel of the same name),  "Young Shoulders" 1984 Play for Today for BBC from John Wain's novel and The Body in the Library (1984, adapted from the Agatha Christie murder mystery). His Come Back, Little Sheba (1977), a TV version of the play by William Inge, was broadcast as part of the anthology series Laurence Olivier Presents. In 1990 Narizzano directed a pilot for a British detective series: Inspector Alleyn Mysteries based on the novels by Dame Ngaio Marsh written in the 1930s. The pilot, titled "Artists in Crime", was first aired 23 December 1990 on BB1.

From the 1960s, Narizzano divided his time between London and Mojácar, Spain. He suffered from recurring depression in adulthood, which worsened in the 1980s following the death of a long-term friend and collaborator, the scriptwriter Win Wells. Toward the end of his life, Narizzano was referred to a psychiatric unit which was part of a voluntary inpatient facility for complex depression and anxiety which provided practical and emotional support as part of St. Pancras Hospital.

Filmography

Film

Television

References

Bibliography
The Macmillan International Film Encyclopedia
Halliwell's Who's Who in the Movies

External links

1927 births
2011 deaths
Anglophone Quebec people
Bishop's University alumni
Canadian expatriates in England
Canadian expatriates in Spain
Film producers from Quebec
Canadian people of Italian descent
Canadian television directors
Canadian television producers
English-language film directors
Film directors from London
Film directors from Montreal